Obvodny Kanal is a station on the Frunzensko–Primorskaya Line of the Saint Petersburg Metro. The station opened on December 30, 2010, between the already completed Volkovskaya and Zvenigorodskaya stations.

Transport 
Buses: 3, 26, 54, 65, 74, 76, 91, 141. Trams: 16, 25, 49.

Saint Petersburg Metro stations
Railway stations in Russia opened in 2010
Railway stations located underground in Russia